Club Atlético Gimnasia y Esgrima (usually known as Gimnasia de Santa Fe) is an Argentine football club. Their home town is the neighbourhood of Ciudadela, in Santa Fe city, Santa Fe Province of Argentina. They currently play in regionalised 5th level of Argentine football Torneo Argentino C.

Gimnasia y Esgrima became the first champion in professional football in Argentina in 1931. Gimnasia won the Santa Fe city professional league before Boca Juniors won the AFA title in Buenos Aires and Newell's Old Boys won the Rosario league title that same year.

See also

List of football clubs in Argentina
Argentine football league system

External links
Gimnasia y Esgrima Club Website 

 
Football clubs in Santa Fe Province
Association football clubs established in 1941
1941 establishments in Argentina